This is a list of cities, towns, villages and hamlets in County Tyrone, Northern Ireland. See the list of places in Northern Ireland for places in other counties.

Towns are listed in bold.

A
Aghyaran
Altamuskin
Altishane
Altmore
Ardboe
Ardstraw
Artigarvan
Augher
Aughnacloy

B
Ballygawley
Ballinderry
Ballymagorry
Ballymully Glebe
Benburb
Beragh
Blackwatertown
Brackaville
Bready
Brockagh

C
Caledon
Cappagh
Carnteel
Carrickmore
Castlecaufield
Castlederg
Clabby
Clady
Clanabogan
Clogher
Coagh
Coalisland
Cookstown
Cranagh
Creggan

D
Derrychrin
Derryloughan
Derrytresk
Donaghmore
Donemana
Dooish
Douglas Bridge
Dromore 
Drumkee
Drumnakilly
Drumquin
Dungannon
Dunnamore

E
Edenderry
Eglish
Erganagh
Eskra
Evish

F
Fintona
Fivemiletown

G
Galbally
Garvaghey
Garvetagh
Gillygooly
Glebe
Glenmornan
Gortaclare
Gortin
Granville
Greencastle

K
Kildress
Killay
Killen
Killeter
Killyclogher
Killyman
Kilskeery
Knockmoyle

L
Landahaussy
Liscloon
Loughmacrory

M
Magheramason
Moortown
Mountfield
Mountjoy
Moy
Moygashel
Moylagh
Mullaghmore

N
Newmills
Newtownstewart

O
Omagh (county town)

P
Plumbridge
Pomeroy

R
Rock
Rousky

S
Sandholes
Seskinore
Shanmaghery
Sion Mills
Sixmilecross
Spamount
Stewartstown
Strabane
Strathroy

T
Tamnamore
Tattyreagh
Trillick
Tullyhogue
Tullywiggan

V
Victoria Bridge

W
Washing Bay

See also
List of civil parishes of County Tyrone
List of townlands in County Tyrone

 
Tyrone
Tyrone
Places